Space Stars is a 60-minute Saturday morning animated program block produced by Hanna-Barbera Productions and broadcast on NBC from September 12, 1981, to January 8, 1982.

Space Stars was narrated by Keene Curtis and featured five cartoon segments each week:
 Space Ghost (2 segments, 6 minutes each)
 The Herculoids (1 segment, 10 minutes)
 Teen Force (1 segment, 7 minutes)
 Astro and the Space Mutts (1 segment, 7 minutes)
 Space Stars Finale (1 segment, 7 minutes)

The cartoons would occasionally cross over into one another. Space Ghost and The Herculoids both had their own respective series in the 1960s. Teen Force and Astro and the Space Mutts were both new segments, although the Astro character was the family dog from The Jetsons.

Opening title narration
The opening title narration was provided by Michael Rye and consisted of the following:

Voice cast
 Michael Bell – Space Ace, Mario Magnetti (in "Menace of the Magnet Maniac"), the Scavenger (in "Wonder Dog")
 Keene Curtis – Narrator
 Richard Erdman –
 June Foray - The Mindwitch (in "Mindwitch")
 Kathy Garver - Krisa (in "Prison Planet")
 Virginia Gregg – Tara
 Darryl Hickman – Kid Comet
 Casey Kasem – The Announcer
 Allan Lurie – Uglor
 Sparky Marcus – Dorno
 Chuck McCann – 
 Don Messick – Astro, Gloop, Gleep, the Director (in "The Education of Puglor"), Reverso (in "Reverso")
 Gary Owens – Space Ghost
 David Raynr – Moleculad (credited as David Hubbard)
 Mike Road – Zandor, Tundro, Zok, Igoo
 Stanley Ralph Ross – The Buccaneer (in "The Buccaneer")
 Michael Rye - Opening Narration
 Steve J. Spears – Jace
 John Stephenson – Space Spectre (in "Space Spectre"), the Elder (in "City in Space"), Jev (in "City in Space")
 Alexandra Stoddart – Jan
 B.J. Ward – Elektra
 Lennie Weinrib – Dipper, Brucie (in "Wonder Dog"), Puglor (in "The Education of Puglor")
 Frank Welker – Cosmo, Blip, the Wizard (in "Web of the Wizard," "Devilship"), the Computer (in "City in Space"),  the Crab (in "The Night of the Crab"), Cubus (in "Spacecube of Doom"), the Destroyer (in "Nomads"), Feron (in "The Big Freeze"), Galactic Vac (in "Galactic Vac is Back"), Lord Raider (in "Wonder Dog"), Noxie (in "Nomads"), Repto (in "The Space Dragons"), Rock Punk (in "Rock Punk"), the Shadow Creature (in "The Shadow People"),  the Starfly (in "The Starfly"), the Starbeast (in "The Starfly")
 Michael Winslow – Glax, Plutem

Segments

Space Ghost

A total of 22 episodes were produced for Space Ghost (two segments aired each week), featuring a new assortment of villains, including an evil version of Space Ghost called Space Spectre (who came from an alternate universe). The Phantom Cruiser and its Scout Ship were also given sleeker and more modernized looks. Space Ghost often came to the aid of the Herculoids and vice versa (as in the original Space Ghost series' "Council of Doom" storyline, where they teamed up for the first time). They also frequently crossed paths with the Teen Force, and it appeared that Jan and Teen Force member Kid Comet were dating as well. Gary Owens reprised his role as Space Ghost, but Tim Matheson was replaced by Steve Spears as the voice of Jace, Ginny Tyler was replaced by Alexandra Stoddart as the voice of Jan, and Don Messick was replaced by Frank Welker as the vocal effects for Blip.

Episodes

The Herculoids

As a departure from the original series, this incarnation of The Herculoids had story direction and content similar to Jonny Quest and Space Ghost. This series takes place on a far-away planet named Quasar in the land of Amzot (the planet was only named as such in this series, though Amzot was first mentioned by name in "The Time Creatures", an episode of the original series). Eleven episodes were produced. Mike Road and Virginia Gregg reprised their roles as Zandor and Tara, respectively. Ted Eccles was replaced by Sparky Marcus as Dorno. Mike Road and Don Messick also reprised their roles as the voices of the Herculoids.

Episodes

Teen Force
Teen Force focused on three superhumanly gifted young students who hail from an unknown alternate universe which is located beyond the confines of the mysterious Black Hole X, which serves as a gateway into the universe in which the other main characters from Space Stars exist.

The Teen Force consists of Kid Comet, who possesses tremendous levels of superhuman speed, enabling him move at speeds exceeding the speed of light, and can even move quickly enough to travel through time; Moleculad, who can control his molecular structure for various effects; and Elektra, who possesses the psionic disciplines of telepathy, telekenesis, and teleportation. Accompanying them are a pair of diminutive blue-skinned aliens named Plutem and Glax, also known as the Astromites. Their principal enemy in the series is Uglor, a mutant native and tyrannical ruler of the planet Uris (whose inhabitants are a race of evolved simians) in Galaxy Q-2. Uglor's mutation granted him bird-like wings and the ability to generate destructive energy blasts from his bionic eyes, which allowed him to see through Space Ghost's Inviso-Power and Elektra's telepathic illusions.

Episodes

Astro and the Space Mutts
Astro and the Space Mutts features Astro, the family dog from The Jetsons. He teams up with two other dogs named Cosmo and Dipper, led by their human leader Space Ace. Together, the trio act as galactic police officers and travel through outer space. Don Messick reprised his role as Astro.

Episodes

Space Stars Finale
Space Stars Finale was the last segment where Space Ghost, the Herculoids, the Teen Force, and Astro and the Space Mutts team up to battle the scourges of the universe.

Episodes

Syndication
In syndication as a 30-minute series, USA Network had one segment each of Space Ghost, Teen Force and The Herculoids, but the Astro and the Space Mutts segments were never shown.

The Space Ghost, The Herculoids and Astro and the Space Mutts segments have been seen on  Cartoon Network and Boomerang, but not the Teen Force segments. Furthermore, the series has never been shown in its entirety on Cartoon Network or Boomerang. These shorts were only broadcast on occasion as an interstitial segment between shows on Boomerang until the mid-2010s.

Astro and the Space Mutts was formerly available on Tubi.

Home video
On October 8, 2013, Warner Archive released Space Stars: The Complete Series on DVD in region 1 as part of their Hanna–Barbera Classics Collection.  This is a Manufacture-on-Demand (MOD) release, available exclusively through Warner's online store and Amazon.com.

References

External links
 
 

1981 American television series debuts
1982 American television series endings
1980s American animated television series
1980s American anthology television series
1980s American science fiction television series
NBC original programming
The Jetsons
Space Ghost television series
Television series by Hanna-Barbera
English-language television shows
American animated television spin-offs
American children's animated action television series
American children's animated anthology television series
American children's animated space adventure television series
American children's animated science fantasy television series
American children's animated superhero television series
Animated television series about extraterrestrial life
Television series set on fictional planets